The Bluebird Café is a 90-seat music club in Nashville, Tennessee that opened in 1982. The club features acoustic music performed by both established singer-songwriters, and cover artists. The Bluebird receives over 70,000 visitors annually. The restaurant has been featured as a location on ABC's drama Nashville.

History
Founder Amy Kurland opened the doors of The Bluebird Café in June 1982 at 4104 Hillsboro Pike in the Green Hills neighborhood of Nashville, Tennessee, several miles south of Music Row and away from most of Nashville's country-music tourist destinations at the time. The location, in a typical suburban shopping center, had already been home over the years to a game room, a bar, a pizza parlor, a sewing machine store, a pharmacy, and Manookian Brothers Oriental Rugs. Kurland originally intended it to be a gourmet restaurant where patrons would have the opportunity to occasionally listen to live music, not a full-fledged nightclub as it would become. As somewhat of an afterthought, Kurland added a stage. The occasional live music became a regular occurrence.

By March 1983, future country star Kathy Mattea had landed a record deal; she had only been playing The Bluebird Café regularly for a few months. After that, the venue became known among local musicians as a prime place to play. Other regular songwriters from The Bluebird also began to land record deals.

On July 1, 1984, the first Writer's Night (an evening in which up-and-coming songwriters have the opportunity to play some of their original material with a special guest who has had some songwriting success) was held, and Don Schlitz was the first special guest. Schlitz had already won a Grammy for writing the Kenny Rogers song "The Gambler," some years earlier. In 1985, Sunday Writer's Nights were officially added to The Bluebird's weekly schedule. These are held weekly at 8:00 p.m. and must be auditioned for to play.

On March 29, 1985, the first "In The Round" show was held with Thom Schuyler (16th Avenue and  Old Yellow Car), J. Fred Knobloch (Used to Blue and Meanwhile), Don Schlitz (he would collect his second Grammy a few years later for Forever and Ever, Amen), and Paul Overstreet (future co-writer of Forever and Ever, Amen as well as other hit songs). The "In The Round" format, which means that writers sit in the center of The Bluebird playing, taking turns, and telling stories, was suggested by Knobloch and Schlitz.

The show and its format were so popular that shows continued to be held "In The Round" and most of the shows at The Bluebird Café (and other clubs in Nashville and elsewhere) are still to this day held in that format. At least once a month Knobloch, Schlitz and Schuyler still play together "In The Round" at The Bluebird Café with harmonica player Jelly Roll Johnson.

Writers had to (and still have to) audition to play its small stage, which was used when shows were not "In The Round." On June 6, 1987, Garth Brooks, then a young, struggling country singer from Oklahoma, auditioned and was booked one month later for a Writer's Night. Shortly thereafter, he was booked for a showcase. It was during that showcase, in which Brooks was filling in for another songwriter who missed the gig, that Lynn Shults, the A&R representative at Capitol Records, saw his show. Brooks was signed to Capitol the next day.

Brooks began to frequent The Bluebird's Writer's Nights looking for songs to record. Bluebird regulars Kent Blazy ("Ain't Goin' Down ('Til the Sun Comes Up)" and "If Tomorrow Never Comes"), Tony Arata ("The Dance") and Pat Alger ("Unanswered Prayers") supplied Brooks with some of his biggest hits.

Also in 1987, dinner shows and Open Mic Nights were added to The Bluebird's schedule. Presently, The Bluebird has two shows a night, with dinner available at both shows. During the weekly show times are generally at 6:00 p.m. and 9:00 p.m. and 6:30 p.m. and 9:30 p.m. on the weekends, though there are exceptions. Monday nights are Open Mic Nights. They begin at 6:00 p.m. and run until approximately 9:00  pm. Anyone can play these Open Mic Nights as long as he or she plays original material and abides by The Bluebird's other policies.

"Women In The Round" night was first held in November 1988. The line-up consisted of Ashley Cleveland, Tricia Walker (she would go on to have multiple cuts by Faith Hill, Patty Loveless, Taylor Swift and more), Pam Tillis and Karen Staley (she would also go on to have many cuts, including multiple Faith Hill hits).

During the 1990s, The Bluebird toured such venues as The Bottom Line in New York City. Such shows are still held outside of Nashville. Bluebird regulars can be seen every summer at Robert Redford's Sundance Resort in Utah.

In 1992, a movie script began circulating about a group of young songwriters living in Nashville who worked at and frequented The Bluebird Café. The Bluebird was so central to the plot of the film that Kurland was flown out to Los Angeles as the technical advisor on the film. That film was the Peter Bogdanovich-directed The Thing Called Love, starring River Phoenix, Samantha Mathis, Dermot Mulroney and Sandra Bullock. Some scenes were shot on location in Nashville. The Thing Called Love was Phoenix's last complete film.

Around 2000, a Turner South (cable network, now defunct) program aired, called Live from the Bluebird Café. It featured songwriters performing many well-known original works and spent five years on the air before the Fox buyout of Turner South, when it was canceled.

The Bluebird Café Scrapbook was published in 2002. It is a history of the club, its famous writers, events, and employees, as told by the writers, employees, and other witnesses. In 2002 The Bluebird Café received an Academy of Country Music Award for Night Club of the Year.

At 14 years old, young singer-songwriter Taylor Swift was discovered at The Bluebird Café by music executive Scott Borchetta.

The Bluebird Café was acquired by the Nashville Songwriters Association International organization on January 1, 2008, purchasing it from Kurland, who remained as an advisor.

"Bluebird," a documentary about the club, was released in November 2019. 

The Bluebird Café is noted for an unusual etiquette policy: patrons are required to remain silent while artists are performing, only applauding or talking in between songs. Those who violate the rule, inadvertently or not, will always receive a stern "Shhhhh," usually from other audience members. This is a feature, akin in respect to that of a typical mid-20th century jazz nightspot, distinguishing the establishment from most other musical venues; Kurland got the idea for it while attending similar clubs as a college student in Washington, D.C., where it was also enforced.

In popular culture  
The Bluebird Café has also been featured on television in nearly every episode of ABC's hit drama Nashville.

"Bluebird Cafe" is a track from John Waite's 1997 album When You Were Mine.

The Bluebird Cafe is also referenced in "Somewhere North of Nashville" from Bruce Springsteen's 2019 album Western Stars.

The Bluebird Cafe has referenced in the Foo Fighters song "Congregation" from the Sonic Highways album.  On May 7, 2014, Foo Fighters frontman Dave Grohl performed a surprise hour-long solo set at The Bluebird Cafe to a crowd of approximately 100 people, supporting the release.

The Bluebird Cafe is referenced in the 2021 country song "A Rebel Like Reba a Diva Like Dolly" by singer-songwriter Jeremy Castle.

References

External links
 The Bluebird Café website

1982 establishments in Tennessee
Buildings and structures in Nashville, Tennessee
Culture of Nashville, Tennessee
Music venues in Tennessee
Nashville (2012 TV series)
Tourist attractions in Nashville, Tennessee
Event venues established in 1982